Alberto Couriel Curiel (born 1935 in Juan Lacaze) is a Uruguayan public accountant and politician, belonging to the Broad Front coalition.

He served as Representative (1990–1995) and then as Senator (since 1995). He was a vocal critic of several finance ministers.

He has written several works on Latin American economics: De la democracia política a la democracia económica y social (1999), Globalización, democracia e izquierda en América Latina (1996), Pobreza y subempleo en América Latina (1983), and "La izquierda y el Uruguay del futuro"(2004).

References

1935 births
Jewish Uruguayan politicians
People from Juan Lacaze
University of the Republic (Uruguay) alumni
Uruguayan accountants
Broad Front (Uruguay) politicians
Members of the Chamber of Representatives of Uruguay
Members of the Senate of Uruguay
Living people